See full list in :Category:Pearl Jam Official Bootlegs.
The Pearl Jam "official" bootlegs are a large, continually growing series of live albums by the American alternative rock band Pearl Jam. Pearl Jam noted the desire of fans to own a copy of the shows they attended and the popularity of bootleg recordings. They had been open in the past about allowing fans to make amateur recordings, and these "official bootlegs" were an attempt to provide a more affordable and better quality product. The official bootlegs are a complete record of almost every show the band plays, excluding club "warm-up" dates.

The band has sold more than 13.5 million copies of shows since launching the bootleg series in 2000.

2000–2001
Pearl Jam's official bootleg program was begun for the band's 2000 Binaural Tour. 72 of the "bootlegs" were released to stores in three waves in late 2000 and early 2001, with the 25 European bootlegs coming first. Every show was released in a cardboard sleeve containing two CDs, with the exception of the 72nd and final show on the tour, November 6, 2000 at KeyArena in Seattle, Washington. The Seattle show was released as a triple-disc set, and was the highest-charting of the series, peaking at number 98 on the Billboard 200, and was called an "essential live document" by Allmusic. Eighteen shows from the tour were chosen by the band as "Ape/Man" shows, which, according to bassist Jeff Ament, were shows the band found "really exciting." With the release of these official bootlegs, Pearl Jam would set a record for most albums to debut in the Billboard 200 at the same time.

2000 official bootlegs
* Asterisk denotes Ape/Man shows

Europe BootlegsReleased: September 26, 2000
1 5/23/00, Estádio do Restelo, Lisbon, Portugal
2 5/25/00, Palau Sant Jordi, Barcelona, Spain (Catalonia)
3 5/26/00, Velodromo de Anoeta, San Sebastian, Spain (Basque Country)
4 5/29/00, Wembley Arena, London, England
5 5/30/00, Wembley Arena, London, England
6 6/1/00, The Point Theatre, Dublin, Ireland
7 6/3/00, SECC, Glasgow, Scotland
8 6/4/00, Manchester Evening News Arena, Manchester, England
9 6/6/00, Cardiff International Arena, Cardiff, Wales
10 6/8/00, Palais Omnisports de Paris-Bercy, Paris, France
11 6/9/00, Rock am Ring, Nürburg, Germany
12 6/11/00, Rock im Park, Nuremberg, Germany
13 6/12/00, Pinkpop, Landgraaf, Netherlands
14 6/14/00, Paegas Arena, Prague, Czech Republic
15 6/15/00, Spodek, Katowice, Poland
16 6/16/00, Spodek, Katowice, Poland
17 6/18/00, Residenzplatz, Salzburg, Austria
18 6/19/00, Hala Tivoli, Ljubljana, Slovenia
19 6/20/00, Arena di Verona, Verona, Italy
20 6/22/00, FILA Forum Arena, Milan, Italy
21 6/23/00, Hallenstadion, Zurich, Switzerland
22 6/25/00, Wuhlheide, Berlin, Germany
23 6/26/00, Alsterdorfer Sporthalle, Hamburg, Germany
24 6/28/00, Sjöhistoriska Museet, Stockholm, Sweden
25 6/29/00, Spektrum, Oslo, Norway

North America Leg 1 BootlegsReleased: February 27, 2001
26 8/3/00, GTE Virginia Beach Amphitheater, Virginia Beach, Virginia
27 8/4/00, Blockbuster Pavilion, Charlotte, North Carolina
28 8/6/00, Greensboro Coliseum, Greensboro, North Carolina
29 8/7/00, Philips Arena, Atlanta, Georgia
30 8/9/00, Mars Music Amphitheatre, West Palm Beach, Florida
31 8/10/00, Mars Music Amphitheatre, West Palm Beach, Florida
32 8/12/00, Ice Palace, Tampa, Florida
33 8/14/00, New Orleans Arena, New Orleans, Louisiana
34 8/15/00, Pyramid Arena, Memphis, Tennessee
35 8/17/00, AmSouth Amphitheater, Antioch, Tennessee
36 8/18/00, Deer Creek Music Center, Noblesville, Indiana
37 8/20/00, Riverbend Music Center, Cincinnati, Ohio
38 8/21/00, Polaris Amphitheater, Columbus, Ohio
39 8/23/00, Jones Beach Amphitheater, Wantagh, New York
40 8/24/00, Jones Beach Amphitheater, Wantagh, New York
41 8/25/00, Jones Beach Amphitheater, Wantagh, New York
42 8/27/00, Saratoga Performing Arts Center, Saratoga Springs, New York
43 8/29/00, Tweeter Center Boston, Mansfield, Massachusetts
44 8/30/00, Tweeter Center Boston, Mansfield, Massachusetts
45 9/1/00, Philadelphia, Pennsylvania
46 9/2/00, Blockbuster Music Entertainment Centre, Camden, New Jersey
47 9/4/00, Merriweather Post Pavilion, Columbia, Maryland
48 9/5/00, Post-Gazette Pavilion, Pittsburgh, Pennsylvania

North America Leg 2 BootlegsReleased: March 27, 2001
49 10/4/00, Molson Centre, Montreal, Quebec, Canada
50 10/5/00, Air Canada Centre, Toronto, Ontario, Canada
51 10/7/00, The Palace of Auburn Hills, Auburn Hills, Michigan
52 10/8/00, Alpine Valley Music Theatre, East Troy, Wisconsin
53 10/9/00, Allstate Arena, Rosemont, Illinois
54 10/11/00, Riverport Amphitheater, Maryland Heights, Missouri
55 10/12/00, Sandstone Amphitheater, Bonner Springs, Kansas
56 10/14/00, Cynthia Woods Mitchell Pavilion, The Woodlands, Texas
57 10/15/00, Cynthia Woods Mitchell Pavilion, The Woodlands, Texas
58 10/17/00, Smirnoff Music Centre, Dallas, Texas
59 10/18/00, United Spirit Arena, Lubbock, Texas
60 10/20/00, Mesa Del Sol Amphitheatre, Albuquerque, New Mexico
61 10/21/00, Desert Sky Pavilion, Phoenix, Arizona
62 10/22/00, MGM Grand Arena, Las Vegas, Nevada
63 10/24/00, Greek Theatre, Los Angeles, California
64 10/25/00, San Diego Sports Arena, San Diego, California
65 10/27/00, Selland Arena, Fresno, California
66 10/28/00, Blockbuster Pavilion, Devore, California
67 10/30/00, Sacramento Valley Amphitheater, Marysville, California
68 10/31/00, Shoreline Amphitheatre, Mountain View, California
69 11/2/00, Rose Garden Arena, Portland, Oregon
70 11/3/00, Idaho Center, Nampa, Idaho
71 11/5/00, KeyArena, Seattle, Washington
72 11/6/00, KeyArena, Seattle, Washington

Chart positions

2003

The CDs continued for the 2003 Riot Act Tour, but they were not available in stores at first. They had to be ordered through the band's official website, and were mailed out. The bootlegs were made available within a week of each show date. After each leg of the tour, however, certain standout shows were released in stores: February 23, 2003, in Perth, Australia; March 3, 2003, in Tokyo, Japan; May 3, 2003, in State College, Pennsylvania; July 8, 2003, and July 9, 2003, in New York City; and July 11, 2003, in Mansfield, Massachusetts. The State College show was a three-hour, triple disc show, which vocalist Eddie Vedder vowed to make "the longest Pearl Jam show ever played." It was surpassed by the Mansfield show, from the Tweeter Center Boston, in which the band played 45 songs, including an acoustic set. The New York shows, from Madison Square Garden, were released both separately and as a boxed set. The July 8, 2003 show was also released as the Live at the Garden DVD. In 2004, Pearl Jam released Live at Benaroya Hall, and while it came in similar packaging to the bootlegs, it is not considered to be part of the series.

2003 official bootlegs
* denotes a bootleg released to retail stores on June 10, 2003
** denotes a bootleg released to retail stores on July 15, 2003
*** denotes a bootleg released to retail stores on September 16, 2003
**** denotes a bootleg released as a special edition to retail stores only in Mexico

Note: Number 53 in the series was to have been the band's show at the Riverbend Music Center in Cincinnati, Ohio, however the show was cancelled.

Australia/Japan Bootlegs
1 2/8/03, Brisbane Entertainment Centre, Brisbane, Australia
2 2/9/03, Brisbane Entertainment Centre, Brisbane, Australia
3 2/11/03, Sydney Entertainment Centre, Sydney, Australia
4 2/13/03, Sydney Entertainment Centre, Sydney, Australia
5 2/14/03, Sydney Entertainment Centre, Sydney, Australia
6 2/16/03, Adelaide Entertainment Centre, Adelaide, Australia
7 2/18/03, Rod Laver Arena, Melbourne, Australia
8 2/19/03, Rod Laver Arena, Melbourne, Australia
9 2/20/03, Rod Laver Arena, Melbourne, Australia
10 2/23/03, Burswood Dome, Perth, Australia
11 2/28/03, Izumity 21, Sendai, Japan
12 3/1/03, Pacifico Yokohama, Yokohama, Japan
13 3/3/03, Nippon Budokan, Tokyo, Japan
14 3/4/03, Kosei Nenkin Kaika, Osaka, Japan
15 3/6/03, Nagoyashi Kokaido, Nagoya, Japan

North America Leg 1 Bootlegs
16 4/1/03, Pepsi Center, Denver, Colorado
17 4/3/03, Ford Center, Oklahoma City, Oklahoma
18 4/5/03, Verizon Wireless Amphitheater, San Antonio, Texas
19 4/6/03, Cynthia Woods Mitchell Pavilion, The Woodlands, Texas
20 4/8/03, UNO Lakefront Arena, New Orleans, Louisiana
21 4/9/03, Oak Mountain Amphitheater, Pelham, Alabama
22 4/11/03, Sound Advice Amphitheater, West Palm Beach, Florida
23 4/13/03, St. Pete Times Forum, Tampa, Florida
24 4/15/03, Alltel Pavilion at Walnut Creek, Raleigh, North Carolina
25 4/16/03, Verizon Wireless Amphitheater, Charlotte, North Carolina
26 4/18/03, AmSouth Amphitheater, Antioch, Tennessee
27 4/19/03, HiFi Buys Amphitheatre, Atlanta, Georgia
28 4/21/03, Rupp Arena, Lexington, Kentucky
29 4/22/03, Savvis Center, St. Louis, Missouri
30 4/23/03, Assembly Hall, Champaign, Illinois
31 4/25/03, Gund Arena, Cleveland, Ohio
32 4/26/03, Mellon Arena, Pittsburgh, Pennsylvania
33 4/28/03, First Union Spectrum, Philadelphia, Pennsylvania
34 4/29/03, Pepsi Arena, Albany, New York
35 4/30/03, Nassau Coliseum, Uniondale, New York
36 5/2/03, HSBC Arena, Buffalo, New York
37 5/3/03, Bryce Jordan Center, University Park, Pennsylvania

North America Leg 2 Bootlegs
38 5/28/03, Adams Fieldhouse, University of Montana-Missoula, Missoula, Montana
39 5/30/03, GM Place, Vancouver, British Columbia, Canada
40 6/1/03, Shoreline Amphitheatre, Mountain View, California
41 6/2/03, Verizon Wireless Amphitheatre, Irvine, California
42 6/3/03, Verizon Wireless Amphitheatre, Irvine, California
43 6/5/03, San Diego Sports Arena, San Diego, California
44 6/6/03, MGM Grand Arena, Las Vegas, Nevada
45 6/7/03, Cricket Pavilion, Phoenix, Arizona
46 6/9/03, Smirnoff Music Centre, Dallas, Texas
47 6/10/03, Alltel Arena, Little Rock, Arkansas
48 6/12/03, Verizon Wireless Amphitheater, Bonner Springs, Kansas
49 6/13/03, Mid-America Center, Council Bluffs, Iowa
50 6/15/03, Fargodome, Fargo, North Dakota
51 6/16/03, Xcel Energy Center, Saint Paul, Minnesota
52 6/18/03, United Center, Chicago, Illinois
54 6/21/03, Alpine Valley Music Theater, East Troy, Wisconsin
55 6/22/03, Verizon Wireless Music Center, Noblesville, Indiana
56 6/24/03, Polaris Amphitheater, Columbus, Ohio
57 6/25/03, DTE Energy Music Theatre, Clarkston, Michigan
58 6/26/03, DTE Energy Music Theatre, Clarkston, Michigan
59 6/28/03, Molson Amphitheatre, Toronto, Ontario, Canada
60 6/29/03, Bell Centre, Montreal, Quebec, Canada
61 7/1/03, Nissan Pavilion, Bristow, Virginia
62 7/2/03, Tweeter Center Boston, Mansfield, Massachusetts
63 7/3/03, Tweeter Center Boston, Mansfield, Massachusetts
64 7/5/03, Tweeter Center at the Waterfront, Camden, New Jersey
65 7/6/03, Tweeter Center at the Waterfront, Camden, New Jersey
66 7/8/03, Madison Square Garden, New York, New York
67 7/9/03, Madison Square Garden, New York, New York
68 7/11/03, Tweeter Center, Mansfield, Massachusetts
69 7/12/03, Hersheypark Stadium, Hershey, Pennsylvania
70 7/14/03, PNC Bank Arts Center, Holmdel, New Jersey
71 7/17/03, Palacio de los Deportes, Mexico City, Mexico
72 7/18/03, Palacio de los Deportes, Mexico City, Mexico
73 7/19/03, Palacio de los Deportes, Mexico City, Mexico

Chart positions

2005–2006
Pearl Jam took a year-long touring break until the 2004 Vote for Change tour, but the band elected not to release bootlegs for the six shows from that tour. The band took yet another year off until a fall 2005 tour of Canada and South America. For the first time, the bootlegs were MP3-only, again only available through the band's official website. The music downloads were accompanied by pictures from individual shows. The MP3-only format expanded to include lossless FLAC format for the band's 2006 summer tour for its self-titled eighth album. The digital bootlegs were typically made available within 2–3 days of each show date. The bootlegs were available through the band's official download website, which has since been discontinued.

2005 official bootlegs

North America bootlegs
1 9/1/05, The Gorge, George, Washington
2 9/2/05, General Motors Place, Vancouver, British Columbia, Canada
3 9/4/05, Pengrowth Saddledome, Calgary, Alberta, Canada
4 9/5/05, Rexall Place, Edmonton, Alberta, Canada
5 9/7/05, Credit Union Centre, Saskatoon, Saskatchewan, Canada
6 9/8/05, MTS Centre, Winnipeg, Manitoba, Canada
7 9/9/05, Fort William Gardens, Thunder Bay, Ontario, Canada
8 9/11/05, Memorial Auditorium, Kitchener, Ontario, Canada
9 9/12/05, John Labatt Centre, London, Ontario, Canada
10 9/13/05, Copps Coliseum, Hamilton, Ontario, Canada
11 9/15/05, Bell Centre, Montreal, Quebec, Canada
12 9/16/05, Corel Centre, Ottawa, Ontario, Canada
13 9/19/05, Air Canada Centre, Toronto, Ontario, Canada
14 9/20/05, Colisee Pepsi Arena, Quebec City, Quebec, Canada
15 9/22/05, Metro Centre, Halifax, Nova Scotia, Canada
16 9/24/05, Mile One Stadium, St. John's, Newfoundland, Canada
17 9/25/05, Mile One Stadium, St. John's, Newfoundland, Canada
18 9/30/05, Borgata Events Center, Atlantic City, New Jersey
19 10/1/05, Borgata Events Center, Atlantic City, New Jersey
20 10/3/05, Wachovia Center, Philadelphia, Pennsylvania

Latin America bootlegs
21 11/22/05, Estadio San Carlos de Apoquindo, Santiago, Chile
22 11/23/05, Estadio San Carlos de Apoquindo, Santiago, Chile
23 11/25/05, Ferrocarril Oeste Stadium, Buenos Aires, Argentina
24 11/26/05, Ferrocarril Oeste Stadium, Buenos Aires, Argentina
25 11/28/05, Gigantinho Gymnasium, Porto Alegre, Brazil
26 11/30/05, Pedreira Paulo Leminski, Curitiba, Brazil
27 12/2/05, Pacaembu, São Paulo, Brazil
28 12/3/05, Pacaembu, São Paulo, Brazil
29 12/4/05, Apoteose, Rio De Janeiro, Brazil
30 12/7/05, Auditorio Coca Cola, Monterrey, Mexico
31 12/9/05, Palacio de los Deportes, Mexico City, Mexico
32 12/10/05, Palacio de los Deportes, Mexico City, Mexico

2006 official bootlegs

North America Leg 1 bootlegs
1 5/9/06, Air Canada Centre, Toronto, Ontario, Canada
2 5/10/06, Air Canada Centre, Toronto, Ontario, Canada
3 5/12/06, Pepsi Arena, Albany, New York
4 5/13/06, New England Dodge Music Arena, Hartford, Connecticut
5 5/16/06, United Center, Chicago, Illinois
6 5/17/06, United Center, Chicago, Illinois
7 5/19/06, Van Andel Arena, Grand Rapids, Michigan
8 5/20/06, Quicken Loans Arena, Cleveland, Ohio
9 5/22/06, Palace of Auburn Hills, Detroit, Michigan
10 5/24/06, TD Banknorth Garden, Boston, Massachusetts
11 5/25/06, TD Banknorth Garden, Boston, Massachusetts
12 5/27/06, Tweeter Waterfront, Camden, New Jersey
13 5/28/06, Tweeter Waterfront, Camden, New Jersey
14 5/30/06, MCI Center, Washington, D.C.
15 6/1/06, Continental Airlines Arena, East Rutherford, New Jersey
16 6/3/06, Continental Airlines Arena, East Rutherford, New Jersey

North America Leg 2 bootlegs
17 6/23/06, Mellon Arena, Pittsburgh, Pennsylvania
18 6/24/06, US Bank Arena, Cincinnati, Ohio
19 6/26/06, Xcel Energy Center, Saint Paul, Minnesota
20 6/27/06, Xcel Energy Center, Saint Paul, Minnesota
21 6/29/06, Marcus Amphitheatre, Milwaukee, Wisconsin
22 6/30/06, Marcus Amphitheatre, Milwaukee, Wisconsin
23 7/2/06, Pepsi Center, Denver, Colorado
24 7/3/06, Pepsi Center, Denver, Colorado
25 7/6/06, MGM Grand, Las Vegas, Nevada
26 7/7/06, Cox Arena, San Diego, California
27 7/9/06, The Forum, Inglewood, California
28 7/10/06, The Forum, Inglewood, California
29 7/13/06, Santa Barbara Bowl, Santa Barbara, California
30 7/15/06, Bill Graham Civic Auditorium, San Francisco, California
31 7/16/06, Bill Graham Civic Auditorium, San Francisco California
32 7/18/06, Bill Graham Civic Auditorium, San Francisco California
33 7/20/06, Arlene Schnitzer Concert Hall, Portland, Oregon
34 7/22/06, The Gorge Amphitheatre, George, Washington
35 7/23/06, The Gorge Amphitheatre, George, Washington

Europe bootlegs
36 8/23/06, The Point, Dublin, Ireland
37 8/25/06, Leeds Festival, Leeds, England
38 8/27/06, Reading Festival, Reading, England
39 8/29/06, Gelredome, Arnhem, Netherlands
40 8/30/06, Sportpaleis, Antwerp, Belgium
41 9/1/06, Pavello Olimpic de Badalona, Barcelona, Spain
42 9/2/06, Azkena Rock Festival, Vitoria, Spain
43 9/4/06, Pavilhao Atlantico, Lisbon, Portugal
44 9/5/06, Pavilhao Atlantico, Lisbon, Portugal
45 9/7/06, Palacio de Deportes, Madrid, Spain
46 9/9/06, Le Dome de Marseille, Marseille, France
47 9/11/06, Bercy, Paris, France
48 9/13/06, Bern Arena, Bern, Switzerland
49 9/14/06, PalaMalaguti, Bologna, Italy
50 9/16/06, Arena di Verona, Verona, Italy
51 9/17/06, Forum, Milan, Italy
52 9/19/06, Palaisozaki, Torino, Italy
53 9/20/06, Duomo Square, Pistoia, Italy
54 9/22/06, Sazka Arena, Prague, Czech Republic
55 9/23/06, Wuhlheide, Berlin, Germany
56 9/25/06, Stadthalle, Vienna, Austria
57 9/26/06, Dom Sportova, Zagreb, Croatia
58 9/30/06, OAKA Sports Hall, Athens, Greece

Australia/Hawaii bootlegs
59 11/7/06, Acer Arena, Sydney, Australia
60 11/8/06, Acer Arena, Sydney, Australia
61 11/10/06, Entertainment Center, Brisbane, Australia
62 11/11/06, Entertainment Center, Brisbane, Australia
63 11/13/06, Rod Laver Arena, Melbourne, Australia
64 11/14/06, Rod Laver Arena, Melbourne, Australia
65 11/16/06, Rod Laver Arena, Melbourne, Australia
66 11/18/06, Acer Arena, Sydney, Australia
67 11/19/06, Newcastle Entertainment Centre, Newcastle, Australia
68 11/21/06, Adelaide Entertainment Centre, Adelaide, Australia
69 11/22/06, Adelaide Entertainment Centre, Adelaide, Australia
70 11/25/06, Subiaco Oval, Perth, Australia
71 12/2/06, Blaisdell Center, Honolulu, Hawaii

Online archival releases
11/30/93, Aladdin Theater, Las Vegas, Nevada

2008-2011

The band elected not to release official bootlegs for its 2007 European Tour. Official bootlegs are available for the band's 2008 U.S. Tour through the band's official website in FLAC, MP3, and CD formats. The 2008 bootlegs were released through Kufala Recordings.

Pearl Jam released bootlegs of shows from their 2009-2010 Backspacer Tour exclusively on its website. The bootlegs are available for digital download in MP3 and FLAC format as well as burn-to-order compact disc formats with the CD orders fulfilled by Kufala Records.

2008 official bootlegs
1 6/11/08, Cruzan Amphitheatre, West Palm Beach, Florida
2 6/12/08, St. Pete Times Forum, Tampa, Florida
3 6/14/08, Bonnaroo, Manchester, Tennessee
4 6/16/08, Colonial Center, Columbia, South Carolina
5 6/17/08, Verizon Amphitheatre, Virginia Beach, Virginia
6 6/19/08, Susquehanna Bank Center, Camden, New Jersey
7 6/20/08, Susquehanna Bank Center, Camden, New Jersey
8 6/22/08, Verizon Center, Washington, D.C.
9 6/24/08, Madison Square Garden, New York, New York
10 6/25/08, Madison Square Garden, New York, New York
11 6/27/08, Dodge Amphitheater, Hartford, Connecticut
12 6/28/08, Comcast Center, Mansfield, Massachusetts
13 6/30/08, Comcast Center, Mansfield, Massachusetts

2009 official bootlegs
1 8/8/09, Virgin Festival, Calgary, Alberta, Canada
2 8/11/09, Shephard’s Bush Empire, London, England
3 8/13/09, Sportspaleis Ahoy, Rotterdam, Netherlands
4 8/15/09, Wuhlheide, Berlin, Germany
5 8/17/09, Manchester Evening News Arena, Manchester, England
6 8/18/09, O2 Arena, London, England
7 8/21/09, Molson Amphitheatre, Toronto, Ontario, Canada
8 8/23/09, United Center, Chicago, Illinois
9 8/24/09, United Center, Chicago, Illinois
10 8/28/09, Outside Lands Festival, Golden Gate Park, San Francisco, California
11 9/21/09, KeyArena, Seattle, Washington
12 9/22/09, KeyArena, Seattle, Washington
13 9/25/09, GM Place, Vancouver, British Columbia, Canada
14 9/26/09, Clark County Amphitheare, Ridgefield, Washington
15 9/28/09, E Center, Salt Lake City, Utah
16 9/30/09, Gibson Amphitheater, Universal City, California
17 10/01/09, Gibson Amphitheater, Universal City, California
18 10/04/09, Austin City Limits Music Fest, Austin, Texas
19 10/06/09, Gibson Amphitheater, Universal City, California
20 10/07/09, Gibson Amphitheater, Universal City, California
21 10/09/09, San Diego State University, Viejas Arena, San Diego, California
22 10/27/09, Wachovia Spectrum, Philadelphia, Pennsylvania
23 10/28/09, Wachovia Spectrum, Philadelphia, Pennsylvania
24 10/30/09, Wachovia Spectrum, Philadelphia, Pennsylvania
25 10/31/09, Wachovia Spectrum, Philadelphia, Pennsylvania
26 11/14/09, Member Equity Stadium, Perth, Australia
27 11/17/09, Adelaide Oval, Adelaide, Australia
28 11/20/09, Etihad Stadium, Melbourne, Australia
29 11/22/09, Sydney Football Stadium, Sydney, Australia
30 11/25/09, QSAC Stadium, Brisbane, Australia
31 11/27/09, Mt Smart Stadium, Auckland, New Zealand
32 11/29/09, AMI Stadium, Christchurch, New Zealand

2010 official bootlegs

North America Bootlegs
1 5/1/10, New Orleans Jazz and Heritage Festival, New Orleans, Louisiana
2 5/3/10, Sprint Center, Kansas City, Missouri
3 5/4/10, Scottrade Center, St. Louis, Missouri
4 5/6/10, Nationwide Arena, Columbus, Ohio
5 5/7/10, Verizon Wireless Amphitheatre Indiana, Noblesville, Indiana
6 5/9/10, Quicken Loans Arena, Cleveland, Ohio
7 5/10/10, HSBC Arena, Buffalo, New York
8 5/13/10, Jiffy Lube Live, Bristow, Virginia
9 5/15/10, XL Center, Hartford, Connecticut
10 5/17/10, TD Garden, Boston, Massachusetts
11 5/18/10, The Prudential Center, Newark, New Jersey
12 5/20/10, Madison Square Garden, New York, New York
13 5/21/10, Madison Square Garden, New York, New York

Europe Bootlegs
14 6/22/10, The 02, Dublin, Ireland
15 6/23/10, Odyssey Arena, Belfast, Northern Ireland
16 6/25/10, Hyde Park, London, England
17 6/27/10, Goffertpark, Nijmegen, Holland
18 6/30/10, Wuhlheide, Berlin, Germany
19 7/1/10, Heineken Open'er Festival, Gdynia, Poland
20 7/3/10, Town Square, Arras, France
21 7/4/10, Werchter Festival, Werchter, Belgium
22 7/6/10, Heineken Jammin' Festival, Venice, Italy
23 7/9/10, BBK Live Festival, Bilbao, Spain
24 7/10/10, Alges, Oeiras, Portugal

2011 official bootlegs

Canada bootlegs
1 9/7/11, Montreal
2 9/11/11, Toronto
3 9/12/11, Toronto
4 9/14/11, Ottawa
5 9/15/11, Hamilton
6 9/17/11, Winnipeg
7 9/19/11, Saskatoon
8 9/21/11, Calgary
9 9/23/11, Edmonton
10 9/25/11, Vancouver

Latin America bootlegs
11 11/3/11, Sao Paulo, Brazil
12 11/4/11, Sao Paulo, Brazil
13 11/6/11, Rio De Janeiro, Brazil
14 11/9/11, Curitiba, Brazil
15 11/11/11, Porto Alegre, Brazil
16 11/13/11, Buenos Aires, Argentina
17 11/16/11, Santiago, Chile
18 11/18/11, Estadio San Marcos, Lima, Peru
19 11/20/11, San Jose, Costa Rica

2012-2018
Official bootlegs for the band's 2012 Tour were available through the band's official website in MP3, FLAC, 24-bit/96 kHz FLAC formats, as well as physical compact discs. The CD orders are fulfilled by nugs.net. In addition, ALAC and 24-bit/96 kHz ALAC formats are available on the nugs.net website.

The 2012 bootlegs each premiered one week before their official release on SiriusXM Pearl Jam Radio.

Bootlegs in this format continued to be released on subsequent Pearl Jam tours from 2013 through to 2018.

2012 official bootlegs

Europe bootlegs
1 6/20/12, Manchester Arena, Manchester, England
2 6/21/12, Manchester Arena, Manchester, England
3 6/23/12, Isle of Wight Festival, Isle of Wight, England
4 6/26/12, Ziggo Dome, Amsterdam, Netherlands
5 6/27/12, Ziggo Dome, Amsterdam, Netherlands
6 6/29/12, Rock Werchter, Werchter, Belgium
7 6/30/12, Main Square Festival, Arras, France
8 7/2/12, O2 Arena, Prague, Czech Republic
9 7/4/12, O2 World Berlin, Berlin, Germany
10 7/5/12, O2 World Berlin, Berlin, Germany
11 7/7/12, Ericsson Globe, Stockholm, Sweden
12 7/9/12, Spektrum, Oslo, Norway
13 7/10/12, Forum, Copenhagen, Denmark

North America bootlegs
14 9/21/12, Deluna Festival, Pensacola, Florida
15 9/22/12, Music Midtown, Atlanta, Georgia
16 9/30/12, Adams Center, Missoula, Montana

2013 official bootlegs

South America bootlegs
1 3/31/13, Lollapalooza Brazil, Sao Paulo, Brazil
2 4/3/13, El Festival Mas Grande, Buenos Aires, Argentina
3 4/6/13, Lollapalooza Chile, Santiago, Chile

North America bootlegs
4 10/11/13, Consol Energy Center, Pittsburgh, Pennsylvania
5 10/12/13, First Niagara Center, Buffalo, New York
6 10/15/13, DCU Center, Worcester, Massachusetts
7 10/16/13, DCU Center, Worcester, Massachusetts
8 10/18/13, Barclays Center, Brooklyn, New York
9 10/19/13, Barclays Center, Brooklyn, New York
10 10/21/13, Wells Fargo Arena, Philadelphia, Pennsylvania
11 10/22/13, Wells Fargo Arena, Philadelphia, Pennsylvania
12 10/25/13, XL Center, Hartford, Connecticut
13 10/27/13, 1st Mariner Arena, Baltimore, Maryland
14 10/29/13, John Paul Jones Arena, Charlottesville, Virginia
15 10/30/13, Time Warner Cable Arena, Charlotte, North Carolina
16 11/1/13, Voodoo Festival, New Orleans, Louisiana
17 11/15/13, American Airlines Center, Dallas, Texas
18 11/16/13, Chesapeake Energy Arena, Oklahoma City, Oklahoma
19 11/19/13, Jobing.com Arena, Phoenix, Arizona
20 11/21/13, Viejas Arena, San Diego, California
21 11/23/13, LA Sports Arena, Los Angeles, California
22 11/24/13, LA Sports Arena, Los Angeles, California
23 11/26/13, Oracle Arena, Oakland, California
24 11/29/13, Rose Garden, Portland, Oregon
25 11/30/13, Spokane Arena, Spokane, Washington
26 12/2/13, Scotiabank Saddledome, Calgary, Alberta, Canada
27 12/4/13, Rogers Arena, Vancouver, British Columbia, Canada
28 12/6/13, Key Arena, Seattle, Washington

2014 official bootlegs

Australia/New Zealand bootlegs
1 1/17/14, Big Day Out, Western Springs Stadium, Auckland, New Zealand
2 1/19/14, Big Day Out, Metricon Stadium, Gold Coast, Australia
3 1/24/14, Big Day Out, Flemington Racecourse, Melbourne, Australia
4 1/26/14, Big Day Out, Sydney Fairgrounds, Sydney, Australia
5 1/31/14, Big Day Out, Bonython Park, Adelaide, Australia
6 2/2/14, Big Day Out, Arena Joondalup, Perth, Australia

Europe bootlegs
7 6/16/14, Ziggo Dome, Amsterdam, Netherlands
8 6/17/14, Ziggo Dome, Amsterdam, Netherlands
9 6/20/14, San Siro Stadium, Milan, Italy
10 6/22/14, Nereo Rocco Stadium, Trieste, Italy
11 6/25/14, Stadthalle, Vienna, Austria
12 6/26/14, Wuhlheide, Berlin, Germany
13 6/28/14, Friends Arena, Stockholm, Sweden
14 6/29/14, Telenor Arena, Oslo, Norway
15 7/3/14, Open'er Festival, Gdynia, Poland
16 7/5/14, Rock Werchter Festival, Werchter, Belgium
17 7/8/14, First Direct Arena, Leeds, UK
18 7/11/14, Milton Keynes Bowl, Milton Keynes, UK

North America bootlegs
19 10/1/14, U.S. Bank Arena, Cincinnati, Ohio
20 10/3/14, Scottrade Center, St. Louis, Missouri
21 10/5/14, Austin City Limits Music Festival, Austin, Texas
22 10/8/14, BOK Center, Tulsa, Oklahoma
23 10/9/14, Pinnacle Bank Arena, Lincoln, Nebraska
24 10/12/14, Austin City Limits Music Festival, Austin, Texas
25 10/14/14, FedExForum, Memphis, Tennessee
26 10/16/14, Joe Louis Arena, Detroit, Michigan
27 10/17/14, iWireless Center, Moline, Illinois (No Code full album show)
28 10/19/14, Xcel Energy Center, St. Paul, Minnesota
29 10/20/14, BMO Harris Bradley Center, Milwaukee, Wisconsin (Yield full album show)
30 10/22/14, Pepsi Center, Denver, Colorado

2015 official bootlegs

Latin America bootlegs
1 11/4/2015, Estadio Nacional, Santiago, Chile
2 11/7/2015, Estadio Ciudad de La Plata, La Plata, Argentine
3 11/11/2015, Arena do Grêmio, Porto Alegre, Brazil
4 11/14/2015, Estadio do Morumbi, Sao Paulo, Brazil
5 11/17/2015, Estádio Nacional Mané Garrincha, Brasilia, Brazil
6 11/20/2015, Estadio Mineirão, Belo Horizonte, Brazil
7 11/22/2015, Maracanã Stadium, Rio de Janeiro, Brazil
8 11/25/2015, Simón Bolívar Park, Bogota, Colombia
9 11/28/2015, Foro Sol Satdium, Mexico City, Mexico

2016 official bootlegs

North America bootlegs
1 4/8/2016, Ft. Lauderdale, Florida
2 4/11/2016, Tampa, Florida
3 4/9/2016, Miami, Florida
4 4/13/2016, Jacksonville, Florida
5 4/16/2016, Greenville, South Carolina
6 4/18/2016, Hampton, Virginia
7 4/21/2016, Columbia, South Carolina
8 4/23/2016, New Orleans, Louisiana
9 4/26/2016, Lexington, Kentucky
10 4/28/2016, Philadelphia, Pennsylvania
11 4/29/2016, Philadelphia, Pennsylvania
12 5/1/2016, New York, New York
13 5/2/2016, New York, New York
14 5/5/2016, Quebec City, Quebec
15 5/8/2016, Ottawa, Ontario
16 5/10/2016, Toronto, Ontario
17 5/12/2016, Toronto Ontario
18 6/11/2016, Bonnaroo, Manchester, Tennessee
19 7/9/2016, Telluride, Colorado
20 7/17/2016, Pemberton, British Columbia
21 8/5/2016, Boston, Massachusetts
22 8/7/2016, Boston, Massachusetts
23 8/20/2016, Wrigley Field, Chicago, Illinois
24 8/22/2016, Wrigley Field, Chicago, Illinois

2018 official bootlegs

Latin America bootlegs
1 3/13/2018, Santiago, Chile
2 3/16/2018, Santiago, Chile
3 3/21/2018, Rio de Janeiro, Brazil
4 3/24/2018, Sao Paulo, Brazil

Europe bootlegs
5 6/12/2018, Amsterdam, Netherlands
6 6/13/2018, Amsterdam, Netherlands
7 6/15/2018, Landgraaf, Netherlands
8 6/18/2018, London, England
9 6/22/2018, Milan, Italy
10 6/24/2018, Padova, Italy
11 6/26/2018, Rome, Italy
12 7/1/2018, Prague, Czech Republic
13 7/3/2018, Krakow, Poland
14 7/5/2018, Berlin, Germany
15 7/7/2018, Rock Werchter Festival, Werchter, Belgium
16 7/10/2018, Barcelona, Spain
17 7/14/2018, Lisbon, Portugal
18 7/12/2018, Madrid, Spain
19 7/17/2018, London, England

North America bootlegs
20 8/10/2018, Seattle, Washington
21 8/13/2018, Missoula, Montana
22 8/18/2018, Chicago, Illinois
23 8/20/2018, Chicago, Illinois
24 9/2/2018, Boston, Massachusetts
25 9/4/2018, Boston, Massachusetts

2022
Official bootlegs for the band's 2022 Tour were available through the band's official website in MP3, FLAC, 24-bit/96 kHz FLAC formats, as well as physical compact discs. The CD orders are fulfilled by nugs.net. In addition, ALAC and 24-bit/96 kHz ALAC formats are available on the nugs.net website.

The 2022 bootlegs each premiered on the day of their official streaming broadcast release on SiriusXM Pearl Jam Radio.

2022 official bootlegs

North America Leg 1 bootlegs
1 5/3/22, Viejas Arena, San Diego, California
2 5/6/22, The Forum, Inglewood, California
3 5/7/22, The Forum, Inglewood, California
4 5/9/22, Gila River Arena, Glendale (Phoenix), Arizona
5 5/12/22, Oakland Arena, Oakland, California6 5/13/22, Oakland Arena, Oakland, California7 5/16/22, Save Mart Center, Fresno, CaliforniaEurope bootlegs
8 6/18/2022, Pinkpop, Landgraaf, Netherlands9 6/21/2022, Waldbühne, Berlin, Germany10 6/23/2022, Hallenstadion, Zurich, Switzerland11 6/25/2022, Autodromo Internazionale Enzo e Dino Ferrari, Imola, Italy12 6/28/2022, Festhalle, Frankfurt, Germany13 6/30/2022, Rock Werchter Festival, Werchter, Belgium14 7/3/2022, Lollapalooza Stockholm, Gärdet, Stockholm, Sweden15 7/5/2022, Royal Arena, Copenhagen, Denmark16 7/8/2022, Hyde Park, London, England17 7/9/2022, Hyde Park, London, England18 7/12/2022, Papp László Sportaréna, Budapest, Hungary19 7/14/2022, Tauron Arena, Kraków, Poland20 7/17/2022, Lollapalooza Paris, Hippodrome de Longchamp, Paris, France21 7/25/2022, Ziggo Dome, Amsterdam, NetherlandsNorth America Leg 2 bootlegs
22 9/1/2022, Videotron Centre, Quebec City, Quebec, Canada23 9/3/2022, Canadian Tire Centre, Ottawa, Ontario, Canada24 9/6/2022, FirstOntario Centre, Hamilton, Ontario, Canada25 9/8/2022, Scotiabank Arena, Toronto, Ontario, Canada26 9/10/2022, Apollo Theater, New York City, New York26 9/11/2022, Madison Square Garden, New York City, New York27 9/14/2022, Freedom Mortgage Pavilion, Camden, New Jersey28 9/16/2022, Bridgestone Arena, Nashville, Tennessee29 9/17/2022, Kentucky Expo Center, Louisville, Kentucky30 9/18/2022, Enterprise Center, St. Louis, Missouri31 9/20/2022, Paycom Center, Oklahoma City, Oklahoma32 9/22/2022, Ball Arena, Denver, ColoradoReferences

External links
2000 European Bootleg series review by Rolling Stone''
All Official Bootlegs Series releases at pearljam.com

 
2000s live albums
2010s live albums
2020s live albums